Infusion was an Australian electronica band, originally from Wollongong which formed in 1995. It is best known for its ARIA Music Award-winning song "Girls Can Be Cruel" and Six Feet Above Yesterday.

Career

1995-2002: Early Days and Phrases and Numbers
Infusion founding members, Jamie Stevens and Manuel Sharrad, met in 1988 at a local high school in Wollongong. Frank Xavier also hails from Wollongong, although he did not meet the other two until they had relocated to Sydney.

In 1995, Infusion released its debut single "Smokescreen / Lux" on the Dance Pool label while primarily remixing other artists' tracks.

In 1999, he band signed with Thunk Records, an underground electronic label and released its debut studio album, Phrases and Numbers, in 2000. The trio's music evolved from the rave and club scene, widening in scope to include traditional pop song structures.

Andrew Wowk from In the Mix said the release of "Spike" was "the turning point in their career" saying "the track perfectly encapsulated the group's reinvention of their sound into an unstoppable behemoth of dark, throbbing, techy filth, which came as a fresh, subtle alternative to the over-saturation of floaty, uplifting progressive house of the time."

2003-2013: Six Feet Above Yesterday, All Night Sun Light and split
In October 2003, the group had relocated to Melbourne and signed with Sony BMG. In April 2004, Infusion released the single "Girls Can Be Cruel", which received airplay on Australia's alternative music radio station, Triple J. The song won the ARIA Award for Best Dance Release at the ARIA Music Awards of 2004. The band released Six Feet Above Yesterday in 2004, which won the Best Dance Release at the ARIA Music Awards of 2005. "Better World" and "Natural" were charting singles from the album.

Infusion's album All Night Sun Light was released on 7 July 2009 on its own independent label Futuresque. Infusion performed its last show with Leftfield at the Enmore Theatre in 2013.

Post Infusion
Xavier produces records under the pseudonym Francis Xavier on Australian label Motorik!, and is a member of their rotating deejay collective, The Motorik Vibe Council, alongside members of The Lost Valentinos, The Bang Gang Deejays and Dreems, in addition to production credits on a plethora of tracks including Flight Facilities' debut "Crave You".

Jamie Stevens has released solo under his own name on a large variety of record labels.

2019 Reformation 
On 16 November 2019, after a 7-year hiatus, Manny Sharrad & Jaimie Stevens performed in Melbourne under the Infusion banner, with long time friend and collaborator Phil K in place of Frank Xavier.  The trio played at a laneway festival which took place at Bourke Place in Melbourne and the nightclub La Di Da. It celebrated the 22nd event for event organisers Sunny.

Discography

Albums

Singles

Awards

ARIA Music Awards
Infusion have won two ARIA Music Awards from four nominations.

|-
| rowspan="1"| 1996
| rowspan="1"| "Smokescreen"
| Best Dance Release
| 
|-
| rowspan="1"| 2001
| rowspan="1"| Phrases & Numbers
| Best Dance Release
| 
|-
| rowspan="1"| 2004
| rowspan="1"| "Girls Can Be Cruel"
| Best Dance Release
| 
|-
| rowspan="1"| 2005
| rowspan="1"| Six Feet Above Yesterday
| Best Dance Release
| 
|-

References

External links

Infusion on MusicBrainz

Alternative dance musical groups
ARIA Award winners
Australian electronic music groups
Australian house music groups
Club DJs
Australian electronic rock musical groups
Musical groups established in 1995
Musical groups disestablished in 2013
Remixers